The Five Principles of Peaceful Coexistence are the Chinese government's foreign relations principles first mentioned in the 1954 Sino-Indian Agreement. Also known as Panchsheel, these principles were subsequently adopted in a number of resolutions and statements, including the preamble to the Constitution of the People's Republic of China.

Principles 
The Five Principles, as stated in the Sino–Indian Agreement 1954, are:
 mutual respect for each other's territorial integrity and sovereignty,
 mutual non-aggression,
 mutual non-interference in each other's internal affairs,
 equality and co-operation for mutual benefit, and
 peaceful co-existence
These principles are a strict interpretation of the Westphalian norms of state sovereignty.

History 
The Panchsheel agreement served as one of the most important relation build between India and China to further the economic and security cooperation. An underlying assumption of the Five Principles was that newly independent states after decolonization would be able to develop a new and more principled approach to international relations.

According to V. V. Paranjpe, an Indian diplomat and expert on China, the principles of Panchsheel were first publicly formulated by Zhou Enlai — "While receiving the Indian delegation to the Tibetan trade talks on Dec. 31, 1953 [...] he enunciated them as "five principles governing China’s relations with foreign countries." Then in a joint statement in Delhi on 18 June 1954, the principles were emphasized by the Prime Minister of India, Jawaharlal Nehru, and Premier Zhou Enlai in a broadcast speech made at the time of the Asian Prime Ministers Conference in Colombo, Sri Lanka just a few days after the signing of the Sino-Indian treaty in Beijing. Nehru went so far as to say: "If these principles were recognized in the mutual relations of all countries, then indeed there would hardly be any conflict and certainly no war." It has been suggested that the five principles had partly originated as the five principles of the Indonesian state. In June 1945 Sukarno, the Indonesian nationalist leader, had proclaimed five general principles, or pancasila, on which future institutions were to be founded. Indonesia became independent in 1949. 

The five principles were incorporated in modified form in a statement of Ten Principles of Peaceful Coexistence (known as Dasasila Bandung) issued in April 1955 at the historic Asian-African Conference in Bandung, Indonesia, which did more than any other meeting to form the idea that post-colonial states had something special to offer the world. "A resolution on peaceful co-existence jointly presented by India, Yugoslavia and Sweden was unanimously adopted in 1957 by the United Nations General Assembly". The Five Principles as they had been adopted in Colombo and elsewhere formed the basis of the Non-Aligned Movement, established in Belgrade, Yugoslavia in 1961.

China has often emphasized its close association with the Five Principles. It had put them forward, as the Five Principles of Peaceful Coexistence, at the start of negotiations that took place in Delhi from December 1953 to April 1954 between the Delegation of the PRC Government and the Delegation of the Indian Government on the relations between the two countries with respect to the disputed territories of Aksai Chin and what China calls South Tibet and India Arunachal Pradesh. The 28 April 1954 agreement mentioned above was set to last for eight years. When it lapsed, relations were already souring, the provision for renewal of the agreement was not taken up, and the Sino-Indian War broke out between the two sides.

In 1979, when Atal Bihari Vajpayee, then India's Foreign Minister and future Prime Minister, went to China, the word Panchsheel, found its way into the conversation during talks with the Chinese. On the 50th anniversary of the treaty, the Ministry of Foreign Affairs of the People's Republic of China, said that "a new international order on the basis of the Five Principles of Peaceful Coexistence" should be built. Also in 2004, Premier Wen Jiabao said,

In June 2014, Vice President of India Hamid Ansari was welcomed by China into the Great Hall of the People in Beijing for the commemoration of the 60th anniversary of the signing Panchsheel Treaty. In 2017, Chinese leader Xi Jinping said that "China is ready to work with India to seek guidance from the five principles of Panchsheel".

Other Contexts 

The Five Principles of Peaceful Coexistence are Chinese political norms articulated in other contexts as well. In 1982, Hu Yaobang's report to the 12th National Congress of the Chinese Communist Party stated, "China adheres to an independent foreign policy and develops relationships with other countries under the guidance of the Five Principles of Peaceful Coexistence." According to the view stated by Hu in this report, "China will never be dependent on any big country or group of countries, nor will it yield to the pressure of any big country [...] The Five Principles of Peaceful Coexistence apply to our relations with all countries, including socialist countries."

These principles are also part of the discourse in China-Pakistan relations. In a speech to Pakistani parliament in 1999, Chairman of the Standing Committee of China's National People's Congress Li Peng stated, "China has all along pursued an independent foreign policy of peace and established and developed relations with other countries on the basis of the Five Principles of Peaceful Coexistence." The principles were codified in the April 2005 Treaty of Friendship, Cooperation, and Good Neighborly Relations signed during a visit by Chinese Premier Wen Jiabao to Pakistan.

The Five Principles of Peaceful Coexistence are the fundamental political norms underlying the China-Arab States Cooperation Forum (CACF) and the Forum on China-Africa Cooperation (FOCAC). 

Since the 2011 NATO intervention in Libya, China has more strongly advocated for the Five Principles of Peaceful Coexistence.

China's United Nations Security Council voting behavior reflects its commitment to the Five Principles of Peaceful Coexistence. From 1991 to 2020, the vast majority of China's abstentions and all of its vetoes have occurred on issues that involve territorial integrity, primarily sanctions and the jurisdiction of the International Criminal Court. In her analysis of China's Security Council voting behavior, Professor Dawn C. Murphy concludes, "These votes directly correspond to China's promotion of the Five Principles, especially the principles of mutual respect for territory and sovereignty and mutual noninterference in the internal affairs of other states."

Commentary and criticism 
Bhimrao Ambedkar said of the treaty in the Rajya Sabha "I am indeed surprised that our Hon’ble Prime Minister is taking this Panchsheel seriously [...] you must be knowing that Panchsheel is one of the significant parts of the Buddha Dharma. If Shri Mao had even an iota of faith in Panchsheel, he would have treated the Buddhists in his country in a different manner." In 1958, Acharya Kriplani had said the Panchsheel was "born in sin" because it was set forth with the destruction of a nation; India had approved of ancient Tibet's destruction. 

In 2014, Zhao Gancheng, a Chinese scholar said that on the surface Panchsheel seemed very superficial; but under Xi Jinping Administration it has become relevant again. In 2014, Ram Madhav wrote a piece in the Indian Express titled, "Moving beyond the Panchsheel deception" and said that if India and China decide to move on from the Panchsheel framework, it will benefit both countries.

List of documents containing the five principles

China 

 Preamble to the Constitution of China

China and Afghanistan 

 Friendship and Mutual Non-Aggression Agreement, 1960
 Boundary Treaty, 1963

China and Burma 

 Joint Statement, June 20, 1954
 Treaty of Friendship and Mutual Non-Aggression Agreement, 1960
 Agreement on the Question of Boundary, 1960
 Boundary Treaty, 1960

China and Cambodia 

 Joint Statement, 1958
 Treaty of Friendship and Mutual Non-Aggression Agreement, 1960
 Joint Communique, 1960

China and India 
 India China joint press communique, 23 December 1988
 Border Peace and Tranquility Agreement, 1993
 Agreement on Military Confidence Building Measures, 1996
 Declaration on Principles for Relations and Comprehensive Cooperation, 2003
 Protocol on Modalities for the Implementation of Military Confidence Building Measures along the Line of Actual Control, 2005
 Agreement on the Political Parameters and Guiding Principles for the Settlement of the India-China Boundary Question, 2005
China-India Strategic and Cooperative Partnership for Peace and Prosperity, 2005
 MOU between the Ministry of Defence of India and the Ministry of National Defence of China for Exchanges and Cooperation in the field of Defence, 2006
Joint Statement on Building a Closer Developmental Partnership, 2014

China and Nepal 
 Agreement on the normalisation of diplomatic relations, 1955
 Treaty between the PRC and the Kingdom of Nepal, 1956
 Agreement on Economic Assistance to Nepal, 1956
 Agreement on the Question of Boundary, 1960
 Treaty of peace and friendship, 1960
 Boundary Treaty, 1961

China and Pakistan 
 Boundary Agreement, 1963 (Ten principles)
 Treaty of Friendship, Cooperation, and Good Neighborly Relations, 2005

China and the Russian Federation 
 The Declaration of the Russian Federation and the People's Republic of China on the Promotion of International Law, 25 June 2016

See also 
 History of Indian foreign relations
 Bandung Conference#Declaration or "Ten Principles of Peaceful Coexistence"

References

Further reading 
 https://treaties.un.org/doc/publication/unts/volume%20299/v299.pdf
 (June 2014) Panchsheel. External Publicity Division, Ministry Of External Affairs, Government Of India.
 Sophie Richardson (December 2009). China, Cambodia, and the Five Principles of Peaceful Coexistence. Columbia University Press. 

China–India relations
People's Republic of China diplomacy
Foreign policy doctrines of India
Zhou Enlai
Politics of China